This is a list of notable musical artists associated with the music genre and/or subculture of emo.

Emo is a style of rock music characterized by melodic musicianship and expressive, often confessional lyrics. It originated in the mid-1980s hardcore punk movement of Washington, D.C., where it was known as "emotional hardcore" or "emocore" and pioneered by bands such as Rites of Spring and Embrace. As the style was echoed by contemporary American punk rock bands, its sound and meaning shifted and changed, blending with pop punk and indie rock and encapsulated in the early 1990s by groups such as Jawbreaker and Sunny Day Real Estate. By the mid-1990s numerous emo acts had emerged from the Midwestern and Central United States, and several independent record labels began to specialize in the style.

Emo broke into mainstream culture in the early 2000s with the sales success of Jimmy Eat World and Dashboard Confessional, with the genre's popularity continuing in the  2000s with bands such as My Chemical Romance, Fall Out Boy, and the Red Jumpsuit Apparatus.

List

A 
The Academy Is...
Acceptance
Ace Troubleshooter
AFI
Aiden
Alesana
Alexisonfire
Alkaline Trio
The All-American Rejects
All Time Low
The Almost
Amber Pacific
American Football
Anberlin
And Then There Were None
...And You Will Know Us by the Trail of Dead
The Anniversary
The Appleseed Cast
Armor for Sleep
As Cities Burn
At the Drive-In
August is Falling 
Avion Roe

B 
Bayside
Beefeater
Before Their Eyes
Beloved
Benton Falls
Black Veil Brides
Boys Like Girls
Boys Night Out
Braid
Brand New
The Brave Little Abacus
Bring Me the Horizon

C 
The Cab
Capital Lights
Cap'n Jazz
Chamberlain
Chasing Victory
Christie Front Drive
City of Caterpillar
The Classic Crime
Cobra Starship
Coheed and Cambria
Cute Is What We Aim For

D 
Dads
Dag Nasty
Dashboard Confessional
A Day to Remember
Dead Poetic
Dear Ephesus
Death Cab for Cutie
The Dismemberment Plan
Dizmas
Drive Like Jehu

E 
Edison Glass
Eisley
Elliott
Emanuel
Embrace
Emery
Empire! Empire! (I Was a Lonely Estate)
Escape the Fate
Ever Stays Red
Every Avenue
Eyes Set to Kill

F 
Fall Out Boy
Falling in Reverse
Falling Up
Family Force 5
Farewell, My Love
Finch
Fire Party
Fireflight
Flyleaf
The Fold
Forever Changed
Forever the Sickest Kids
Foxing
Fragile Rock
The Fray
From Autumn to Ashes
From First to Last
Funeral for a Friend
Further Seems Forever

G 
Garden Variety
The Get Up Kids
Gray Matter
Gwen Stacy

H 
Haste the Day
Hawk Nelson
Hawthorne Heights
He Is Legend
Hellogoodbye
Hey Mercedes
Hey Monday
The Higher
Hoover
Hot Rod Circuit
The Hotelier
House of Heroes

I 
I Am Ghost
Ida
Indian Summer
Ivoryline

J 
Jawbreaker
Jets to Brazil
Jetty Bones
Jimmy Eat World
Joan of Arc
The Juliana Theory
 The Junior Varsity

K 
Karate
Kids in the Way
Kiros
Knapsack
Kutless

L 
Letter Kills
Life in Your Way
Lifetime
Lostprophets

M 
Mae
 The Maine
 Matchbook Romance
 Mayday Parade
 Metro Station
 Krystal Meyers
 Mineral
Modern Baseball
 Mom Jeans
Moneen
Moose Blood
Moss Icon
The Movielife
My Chemical Romance

N 
 Native Nod
 New Found Glory
 Noise Ratchet
 Northstar
 Nude
Number One Gun

O 
Once Nothing
 Our Last Night

P 
Panic! at the Disco
Paramore
Pg. 99
Philmont
Pierce the Veil
Pillar
Plain White T's
Pop Unknown
The Promise Ring
Punchline

R 
Rainer Maria
The Red Jumpsuit Apparatus
Rites of Spring
Roses Are Red
Rye Coalition

S 
Saetia
Samiam
Saosin
Saves the Day
Say Anything
Secondhand Serenade
Secret and Whisper
Senses Fail
Sherwood
Showbread
Silverstein
Simple Plan
Small Brown Bike
Sleeping with Sirens
Something Corporate
Spanish Love Songs
The Spill Canvas
Split Lip
Squirrel Bait
Static Dress
The Starting Line
Stavesacre
Story of the Year
Sum 41
Sunny Day Real Estate

T 
Taking Back Sunday
Ten Second Epic
Texas Is the Reason
There for Tomorrow
Thirty Seconds to Mars
This Beautiful Republic
This Providence
Twenty One Pilots
Thrice
Thursday
Tokio Hotel
 Typecast

U 
Underoath
 The Used

V 
The Van Pelt

W 
Watashi Wa
The Wedding

Y 
You, Me, and Everyone We Know

See also 
List of screamo bands
List of emo pop bands
List of post-hardcore bands

References

Bibliography

Notes

Emo musical groups
Lists of punk bands